Kim Bruce Hancock (born 22 July 1966) is a former New Zealand cricketer from Matamata, Waikato, who played five first-class matches for Northern Districts from 1985 to 1987.

Notes

External links
 

1966 births
Living people
People from Matamata
New Zealand cricketers
Northern Districts cricketers
Cricketers from Waikato